Heyat Basketball Langaroud Basketball Club (formerly known as Shahrdari Langaroud) is an Iranian professional basketball club based in Langaroud, Iran. They compete in the Iranian Basketball Super League.

Current roster
2008/2009 season

Management team

External links
page on Asia-Basket

Basketball teams in Iran
Sport in Gilan Province